Ben Lawson (born 6 February 1980) is an Australian actor. From 2006 until 2008, he played Frazer Yeats in the Australian soap opera Neighbours. The role earned him a Logie Award nomination. Lawson has since appeared in several American television series, including The Deep End, Covert Affairs, and Don't Trust the B---- in Apartment 23. In 2011, he starred opposite Natalie Portman and Ashton Kutcher in the film No Strings Attached. From 2017 to 2018, he starred as Damien Rennett on the ABC political drama Designated Survivor. He also played baseball coach Rick Wlodimierzin in the second season of 13 Reasons Why, and Larry Hemsworth on The Good Place. Lawson portrays Lachlan Murdoch in the 2019 film Bombshell, alongside his brother Josh Lawson who played James Murdoch. Since 2021, he stars in the Netflix series Firefly Lane.

Early life
Lawson was born and raised in Brisbane, Queensland.  He attended St. Joseph's College, Gregory Terrace.  His father Peter is a GP and his mother Dianne was a flight attendant then secretary. He is the third of five boys including Josh Lawson, an actor who is known for his appearances on Thank God You're Here. Their parents divorced when Lawson was seven. He has said he was "kicked out" of drama school at the University of Southern Queensland before graduating from the National Institute of Dramatic Art (NIDA).

Career

Acting
Lawson began a starring role in the Australian soap opera Neighbours as Frazer Yeats in 2006. His role earned him a nomination for Most Popular New Male Talent at the 2007 Logie Awards. His character Yeats left in April 2008.

Lawson moved to Los Angeles in 2008. He had a small role in the film No Strings Attached, which starred Natalie Portman and Ashton Kutcher. In August 2012, he landed a recurring role in the ABC sitcom Don't Trust the B---- in Apartment 23 as Benjamin, a love interest for main character Chloe (Krysten Ritter). In 2017, Lawson starred in the short lived CBS drama Doubt opposite Laverne Cox. On The Talk, Cox said that Lawson was "an amazing actor". 

Lawson played Larry Hemsworth, the fictional "hideous shame" of the Hemsworth family on The Good Place, and he and his brother Josh played Lachlan and James Murdoch respectively in the 2019 film Bombshell.

In July 2017, Lawson was cast as MI6 agent Damien Rennett on the second season of the ABC political drama, Designated Survivor. In 2018, Lawson played high school coach Rick on the second season of the Netflix original series, 13 Reasons Why. In 2019, Lawson starred as Thomas 'Clay' Fox Jr. in Dolly Parton's Heartstrings, Netflix's anthology series about Dolly Parton. In 2021, Lawson starred in the Netflix series Firefly Lane opposite Katherine Heigl and Sarah Chalke.

Poetry
During the 2020 Australian bushfires, Lawson wrote a poem titled To My Country, and a video of him reading it went viral on social media. In January 2021, the poem was turned into a book of the same name with illustrations by Bruce Whatley and proceeds from sales going to the Port Macquarie Koala Hospital. In January 2021, he wrote a poem entitled The 26th of January about the history of Australia Day, using sarcasm to support the movement to change the date.

Filmography

Film

Television

References

External links
 

1980 births
20th-century Australian male actors
21st-century Australian male actors
Australian male film actors
Australian male soap opera actors
Living people
Male actors from Brisbane